The Best of the Journal of the Traveller's Aid Society, Volume 2 is a book edited by Loren Wiseman and published by Game Designers' Workshop.

Contents
The Best of the Journal of the Traveller's Aid Society, Volume 2 is a collection of articles from issues 5 through 8 of the Journal of the Travellers Aid Society, which were out of print.

Reception
William A. Barton reviewed The Best of the Journal of the Traveller's Aid Society, Volume 2 in The Space Gamer No. 53. Barton commented that "The Best of the JTAS, Vol. 2 should prove welcome to anyone who missed any Journals from 5 through 8."

See also
Journal of the Travellers Aid Society

References

Traveller (role-playing game)